Great mosque or grand mosque generally refers to:
A jama masjid: a congregational mosque or "Friday" mosque
The Great Mosque of Mecca